Jennifer "Blair" Brown Lipsitz (born March 5, 1988) is a writer and mental performance consultant, and was formerly a volleyball player and coach.

Early life 
Brown Lipsitz grew up in Purcellville, Virginia and attended Loudoun Valley High School, where she helped lead her team to an undefeated season and state championship. She was inducted into the school's hall of fame in 2017.

College 
Brown Lipsitz attended Penn State where she was a member of the teams that won four consecutive national championships, 2007, 2008, 2009, and 2010. She won the Honda Sports Award as the best female collegiate volleyball player in 2010–11. In 2011, she was nominated for the Best Female College Athlete ESPY Award.

Coaching 
Brown Lipsitz started as a volunteer assistant on the volleyball coaching staff at Buffalo in 2014, then in 2015, was named the head volleyball coach, where she remained until 2019.

Awards and honors 

 Virginia Gatorade Player of the year  (2004, 2005)
Honda Sports Award for volleyball

References 

Living people
1988 births
American volleyball coaches
American women's volleyball players
Penn State Nittany Lions women's volleyball players
Buffalo Bulls coaches
People from Purcellville, Virginia